The Shijiazhuang–Taiyuan railway or Shitai railway, known as Zhengding–Taiyuan railway or Zhengtai railway (正太鐵路) in the 1900s, is a railway between Shijiazhuang and Taiyuan, the provincial capitals, respectively, of Hebei and Shanxi provinces in northern China.

See also
 Shijiazhuang–Taiyuan high-speed railway – new, much shorter railway between the same end points

Railway lines in China
Rail transport in Hebei
Rail transport in Shanxi
Railway lines opened in 1907